Yannick Noah was the defending champion but lost in the second round to Slobodan Živojinović.

Boris Becker won in the final 6–1, 6–2 against Alexander Volkov.

Seeds
A champion seed is indicated in bold text while text in italics indicates the round in which that seed was eliminated.

  Boris Becker (champion)
  Miloslav Mečíř (first round)
  John McEnroe (semifinals)
  Jakob Hlasek (second round)
  Henri Leconte (first round)
  Yannick Noah (second round)
  Jonas Svensson (second round)
 n/a

Draw

External links
 1989 Stella Artois Indoor Draw

Milan Indoor
1989 Grand Prix (tennis)
Milan